Big Loo was a toy robot manufactured by Louis Marx and Company for the 1963 Christmas holiday season. It retailed for $9.99. The toy, primarily made of injection molded hi-impact polystyrene parts, stood three-feet tall (37-inches), a foot wide, and nine inches deep.

Its key features included a sight scope with cross-hairs, two flashing battery-powered red eyes with an on-off switch, a hand-cranked mechanical voice box that played ten messages, two rubber-tipped darts that were fired from triggers on the back, a left arm that held four red balls which were fired from a spring in the left elbow, and a right arm that had a grasping claw able to pick up objects.  One foot was equipped with a spring-powered rocket.  It could also squirt water from its navel and was equipped with a compass, whistle, bell, a Morse code clicker with chart, and could bend over at the waist .

Big Loo was featured on the cover of the Los Lobos album Colossal Head.

External links
Marx Museum, The Big Toys
Museum of Science and Industry Chicago, Robots and Space Toys Gallery - Big Loo
Toy and Train Museum
Big Loo - Your Friend From The Moon

Toy brands
1960s toys
Toy robots
Products introduced in 1963